Małgorzata Prokop-Paczkowska (born 27 August 1960) is a Polish journalist, television producer and politician. Member of the Sejm representing the New Left.

Electoral history

References

1960 births
Living people
Your Movement politicians
Members of the Polish Sejm 2019–2023
Women members of the Sejm of the Republic of Poland
21st-century Polish women politicians